VersaEmerge is the self-titled EP of the American experimental rock band of the same name. It is the first of their efforts not to be self-released. After signing to Fueled By Ramen, the band began writing the EP, recording it with producer James Paul Wisner (Underoath, Dashboard Confessional, The Academy Is..., My American Heart). This EP was available from their then-upcoming tours "The Secret Valentine Tour" and the "Craig Owens Tour", and is still available from the Fueled By Ramen webstore, and iTunes Store. The record reached #44 on the Billboard Heatseekers chart. 'Past Praying For' is the first single from the EP and a music video was made. In December 2009, they released 'Whisperer' as their second and last single with a tour video as the promotional clip.

Track listing

References

2009 EPs
Experimental rock EPs
Fueled by Ramen EPs
Versa (band) EPs
Albums produced by James Paul Wisner